Laurentian Valley is a township municipality in Renfrew County in eastern Ontario, Canada. It borders on the Ottawa River, the city of Pembroke and the town of Petawawa.

This township was created on January 1, 2000, from the former townships of Stafford-Pembroke and Alice and Fraser.

Communities 
The township comprises the communities of Alice, Cotnam Island, Davis Mills, Fairview, Forest Lea, French Settlement, Gorr Subdivision, Government Road, Greenwood, Hiam, Huckabones Corners, Indian, Kathmae Siding, Locksley, Lower Stafford, Micksburg, Pleasant View, Shady Nook, Stonebrook and Trautrim Subdivision.

Demographics 

Budget
For the 2010–2011 fiscal year, the township will spend .

See also
List of townships in Ontario

References

External links

Lower-tier municipalities in Ontario
Municipalities in Renfrew County
Township municipalities in Ontario